Nick Jones (born July 5, 1985) is an American football coach and former player. He is an offensive assistant for the Los Angeles Rams of the National Football League (NFL). He played center for the Georgia Bulldogs.

Coaching career
Jones was an offensive graduate assistant for Georgia in 2010 and 2011. He was the tight ends coach and tackles coach for Coastal Carolina from 2012 to 2017. Jones coached tight ends for Air Force in 2018. Jones was hired by Colorado State as co-special teams coordinator and tight ends coach in February 2019. He joined the Atlanta Falcons in 2020 as a diversity coaching fellow. He was hired by Georgia Southern as their special teams coordinator and tight ends coach in January 2021, but left to join the Los Angeles Rams as an offensive assistant on February 23, 2021. In Jones first season, the Rams won Super Bowl LVI against the Cincinnati Bengals.

References

External links
Georgia Bulldogs bio
Georgia Force bio

1985 births
Living people
People from Carroll County, Georgia
Sportspeople from the Atlanta metropolitan area
Players of American football from Georgia (U.S. state)
American football centers
Georgia Bulldogs football players
Seattle Seahawks players
New York Giants players
Georgia Force players
Detroit Lions players
Georgia Bulldogs football coaches
Coastal Carolina Chanticleers football coaches
Air Force Falcons football coaches
Colorado State Rams football coaches
Atlanta Falcons coaches
Los Angeles Rams coaches